Nalla Reddi Naidu BA, L.L.B. (13 January 1917 – July 1982) was an Indian lawyer and politician. He was a Member of Parliament from 1952 to 1957.

Biography 
Nalla Reddi Naidu was born on 13 January 1917, in Edarada, East Godavari District, Andhra Pradesh in a Zamindari family. Rao Bahadur Sir Kurma Venkata Reddy Naidu, who was the Governor General of erstwhile Madras State, was his father's cousin. The former served as a motivation for Reddi Naidu to join politics and social service. The family lived in Nalla Street, Amalapuram. He graduated in Law from the Pune University and was a junior to Shri P. V. Narasimha Rao, ex-PM of India at the University. He was very actively involved in India's Freedom movement and also later in farmer's movement in 1954. He was the first Member of Parliament (M.P) between 1952 and 1957 from the constituency of Rajahmundry (Rajamahendravaram), East Godavari Dist. Reddi Naidu contested the Parliament elections in 1952, from the Praja Socialist Party of India from the Rajahmundry (Lok Sabha constituency) against Durgabai Deshmukh of Congress Party and won the elections with a large majority. Consequently, during his tenure as MP, he had shifted to the Congress Party in 1954.
Apart from being the M.P., he also served as Chairman of Amalapuram thrice. Besides politics, he was practising law and was a leading criminal lawyer. He never lost a single case during his practising period. He died in July 1982 leaving a legacy behind.

References 

1917 births
1982 deaths
People from East Godavari district
20th-century deaths from tuberculosis
20th-century Indian lawyers
Indian National Congress politicians from Andhra Pradesh
India MPs 1952–1957
Praja Socialist Party politicians
Lok Sabha members from Andhra Pradesh
Tuberculosis deaths in India